Mit Leib und Seele (German for "With Body and Soul") may refer to:

Mit Leib und Seele (TV series)
Mit Leib und Seele (Schandmaul album)
Mit Leib und Seele, Kärbholz album
"Mit Leib und Seele", Heinz Rudolf Kunze song

See also
Body and Soul (disambiguation)